Clifton is a historic home located at Kilmarnock, Northumberland County, Virginia.  It was built about 1785, and is a two-story, Georgian style frame dwelling with brick nogging.  It is topped by a gable roof and the exterior is finished in plain, circular-sawn weatherboards. It is a rare example of a four-square plan with central chimney, combined with a front passage and paired stairs.

It was listed on the National Register of Historic Places in 2004.

References

Houses on the National Register of Historic Places in Virginia
Georgian architecture in Virginia
Houses completed in 1785
Houses in Northumberland County, Virginia
National Register of Historic Places in Northumberland County, Virginia